Sirlord Calvin Conteh (born 9 July 1996) is a German professional footballer who plays as a winger for  club SC Paderborn.

Career
Conteh made his professional debut for 1. FC Magdeburg in the 3. Liga on 3 August 2019, starting against SV Meppen before being substituted out in the 42nd minute for Manfred Osei Kwadwo, with the away match finishing as a 3–1 win.

In May 2022, 2. Bundesliga club SC Paderborn 07 announced the signing of Conteh.

Personal life
Conteh was born in Hamburg to parents who emigrated from Ghana. His younger brother Christian Conteh is also a professional footballer.

References

External links
 
 Profile at kicker.de
 

1996 births
Living people
Footballers from Hamburg
German footballers
Ghanaian footballers
German sportspeople of Ghanaian descent
Association football wingers
FC St. Pauli II players
1. FC Magdeburg players
SC Paderborn 07 players
3. Liga players
Regionalliga players
2. Bundesliga players